Boulazac Basket Dordogne, also known as BBD or simply Boulazac, is a French professional basketball club, based in Boulazac. The team currently plays in the LNB Pro A currently named Jeep Elite for sponsoring reason, the first level of basketball in France.

The club plays its games in its home arena Le Palio, which can host up to 5,200 spectators.

History
Originally playing in Périgueux as US périgourdine, the club moved to the city of Boulazac (suburb of Périgueux) in 1992 when a new sport hall was constructed. The club evolved in French Pro B from 2005 to 2012. The club finished 2nd in the 2011–12 LNB Pro B and was finalist in the play-offs, gaining the right to compete in top Pro A league for the 2012–13 season.

Season by season

Players

Current roster

Notable players

References

External links
Official website 

Basketball teams in France
Basketball teams established in 1992
Dordogne